Truss is a surname. Notable people with the name include:

John Truss (born 1947), British mathematician, father of Liz
Liz Truss (born 1975), former UK prime minister
Lynne Truss (born 1955), British writer and journalist
Warren Truss (born 1948), Australian politician
Xavier Truss (born 2001), American football player

References 

Occupational surnames
English-language surnames
English-language occupational surnames